Goldstein may refer to:

 Goldstein (surname), people with the surname Goldstein
 Goldstein (film), a 1964 Philip Kaufman movie featuring actors from the Second City comedy troupe
 Goldstein & Blair, a publishing company
 Division of Goldstein, an electoral division in the Australian state of Victoria
 The Leon M. Goldstein High School for the Sciences
 Goldstein College, a residential college at the University of New South Wales
 Goldstein (Frankfurt am Main), a housing area in Frankfurt am Main, Germany

See also 
 The Theory and Practice of Oligarchical Collectivism, sometimes known as Goldstein's book, a fictional book in the novel Nineteen Eighty-Four
 Goldstone (disambiguation)
 Goldstine, a surname